The 1932 Cal Poly Mustangs football team represented California Polytechnic School—now known as California Polytechnic State University, San Luis Obispo—as an independent during the 1932 college football season. Led by Al Agosti in his 11th and final season as head coach, Cal Poly compiled a record of 4–4. The team outscored its opponents 117 to 103 for the season. The Mustangs played home games in San Luis Obispo, California.

Agosti finished his tenure at Cal Poly with an overall record of 32–44–5. Cal Poly was a two-year school until 1941 and competed as an independent from 1929 to 1945.

Schedule

Notes

References

Cal Poly
Cal Poly Mustangs football seasons
Cal Poly Mustangs football